The 1974 USA Outdoor Track and Field Championships men's competition took place between June 21–23 at Drake Stadium on the campus of University of California, Los Angeles in Westwood, California. The women's division held their championships separately a little over a hundred miles north in Bakersfield at Memorial Stadium, which had hosted the men's division the previous year. The two schools had also shared hosting the championships in 1970 with reverse roles. The women's division would compete at imperial distances, the last time that measurement system was used in the American championships. Since 1975's edition, the USATF rulebook has called for metric values.

Results

Men track events

Men field events

Women track events

Women field events

See also
United States Olympic Trials (track and field)

References

 Results from T&FN
 results

USA Outdoor Track and Field Championships
Usa Outdoor Track And Field Championships, 1974
Track and field
Track and field in California
Outdoor Track and Field Championships
Outdoor Track and Field Championships
Sports competitions in California